Nicholas Joseph Begich Sr. (born April 6, 1932 – disappeared October 16, 1972; declared dead December 29, 1972) was an American politician who served as a member of the United States House of Representatives from Alaska. He is presumed to have died in the crash of a light aircraft in Alaska in 1972; his body was never found. He was a member of the Democratic Party.

Early life and education
Begich was born and raised in Eveleth, Minnesota. His father, John Begich (né Begić), was born in Podlapača, Udbina, Croatia, Nick Sr.'s  mother, Anna (née Martinić), was also of Croatian descent. He earned a Bachelor of Arts from Saint Cloud State University in 1952 and a Master of Arts from the University of Minnesota 1954. He took graduate courses at the University of Colorado Boulder and University of North Dakota.

Career
Begich worked as a guidance counselor in the schools of Anchorage, and he was later Director of Student Personnel for the Anchorage school system before becoming Superintendent of Schools at Fort Richardson. In 1962, Begich was elected to the Alaska Senate, where he served for eight years. Begich also taught political science during parts of this period at the University of Alaska at Anchorage.

In 1968, Begich ran for Alaska's only House seat and lost to the incumbent Representative, Republican Howard Pollock.

In 1970, Pollock ran for Governor of Alaska and Begich ran again for the seat and was now successful by defeating the Republican banker Frank Murkowski, who later served as a U.S. Senator and then as Governor of Alaska. In 1972 for his re-election, Begich was opposed by Republican state senator Don Young.

Posthumously, Begich won the 1972 election, with 56% to Don Young's 44%. However, after Begich was declared dead, a special election was held. Young won the seat and stayed in that position until his death on March 18, 2022. Mary Peltola won the following special election and became the first Democrat in 49 years to hold the seat.

Disappearance

On October 16, 1972, he and House Majority Leader Hale Boggs, of Louisiana, were two of the four men on board a twin engine Cessna 310 when the airplane disappeared during a flight from Anchorage to Juneau. Also on board were Begich's aide, Russell Brown, and the pilot, Don Jonz. The four were heading to a campaign fundraiser for Begich.

In an enormous search effort, search and rescue aircraft of the United States Coast Guard, Navy, Army, Air Force, Civil Air Patrol and civilians were deployed to look for the four men and the missing Cessna 310. On November 24, 1972, after proceeding for 39 days, the air search was suspended. Neither the airplane nor any of its four occupants were ever found. All were declared dead on December 29, 1972.

The Cessna was required to carry an emergency locator transmitter (ELT) per Alaska state statutes section 02.35.115, Downed Aircraft Transmitting Devices, which took effect on September 6, 1972, five weeks before the plane disappeared. The Alaska statute made reference to Federal Aviation Regulation 91.52, published on September 21, 1971, which mandated ELTs in aircraft such as this, but had an effective date of December 30, 1973, for existing aircraft.

No ELT signal determined to be from the plane was heard during the search. In its report on the incident, the National Transportation Safety Board (NTSB) stated that the pilot's portable ELT, permissible in lieu of a fixed ELT on the plane, was found in an aircraft at Fairbanks, Alaska. The report also notes that a witness saw an unidentified object in the pilot's briefcase that resembled, except for color, the portable ELT. The NTSB concluded that neither the pilot nor aircraft had an ELT.

In 1972, the tallest building in Whittier, Alaska, was renamed to Begich Towers in memory of Nick Begich. Begich Peak which is three miles north of the Begich, Boggs Visitor Center at Portage Lake was also named after him.

In November 2015, a Seattle Weekly story detailed the work of journalist Jonathan Walczak, who since 2012 has investigated the plane crash and subsequent events in an effort to determine the fate of the flight that carried Begich and Boggs. Walczak created a podcast about Begich's disappearance, which was released by iHeartMedia in the summer of 2020. The podcast, called Missing in Alaska, explored the conspiratorial ideas that FBI Director J. Edgar Hoover or Detroit mobsters operating in Tucson had assassinated Hale Boggs.

Electoral history

Personal life
In 1956, Begich married Margaret Jean Jendro, nicknamed Pegge. They had six children: Nick Jr., Mark, Nichelle, Tom, Stephanie, and Paul. Mark was elected as a member of the Anchorage Borough Assembly, then became mayor, and was narrowly elected as the junior U.S. senator from Alaska, in 2008. The incumbent, Republican Ted Stevens, had been convicted of seven felonies, eight days before the 2008 election, after being caught up in the Alaska political corruption probe. In 2016, Nick's son Tom won the Democratic primary nomination for Seat  J in the Alaska Senate, has faced little opposition in that general election and since, was redistricted to Seat I in 2020, and remains in that office in 2022.

Nick's brother Joseph Begich served 18 years in the Minnesota House of Representatives from their hometown of Eveleth. Nick Begich's widow, Pegge, briefly married Jerry Max Pasley. She ran for the House of Representatives seat in 1984 and 1986, but was defeated by the incumbent, Don Young.

See also
List of people who disappeared mysteriously at sea
List of United States Congress members who died in office

References

External links

 Nicholas Begich at 100 Years of Alaska's Legislature

1932 births
1972 deaths
1970s missing person cases
20th-century American politicians
Accidental deaths in Alaska
Democratic Party Alaska state senators
American people of Croatian descent
School superintendents in Alaska
Democratic Party members of the United States House of Representatives from Alaska
Missing air passengers
Missing person cases in Alaska
People declared dead in absentia
People from Eveleth, Minnesota
Politicians elected posthumously
Politicians from St. Cloud, Minnesota
St. Cloud State University alumni
University of Alaska Anchorage faculty
University of Colorado alumni
University of Minnesota alumni
University of North Dakota alumni
Victims of aviation accidents or incidents in 1972
Victims of aviation accidents or incidents in the United States
Begich family